The Katrol Formation is a Mesozoic geologic formation in India. Fossil sauropod tracks have been reported from the formation. An indeterminate ophthalmosaurid ichthyosaur is also known from the formation in the Kutch district.

See also 
 List of dinosaur-bearing rock formations
 List of stratigraphic units with sauropodomorph tracks
 Sauropod tracks

References

Bibliography 
 Weishampel, David B.; Dodson, Peter; and Osmólska, Halszka (eds.): The Dinosauria, 2nd, Berkeley: University of California Press. 861 pp. 

Geologic formations of India
Kimmeridgian Stage
Tithonian Stage
Ichnofossiliferous formations